Benoit-Olivier "Bo" Groulx (born February 6, 2000) is a French-born Canadian professional ice hockey forward currently playing for the San Diego Gulls in the American Hockey League (AHL) as a prospect to the Anaheim Ducks of the National Hockey League (NHL). Groulx was drafted 54th overall by the Ducks in the 2018 NHL Entry Draft.

Playing career
Groulx was selected first overall by the Halifax Mooseheads in the 2016 QMJHL Entry Draft. In his first season with the club, he recorded 14 goals and 17 assists in 62 games. He also skated in six playoff games, scoring one goal and one assist; the Mooseheads were eliminated in the first round by the Rouyn-Noranda Huskies.

Groulx was selected in the second round (54th overall) by the Anaheim Ducks during the 2018 NHL Entry Draft. He was returned to the Mooseheads for the 2018–19 season, where he recorded 80 points in 65 games. On October 10, 2019, the Ducks signed Groulx to a three-year, entry-level contract.

Groulx was named the 2019–20 QJMHL best defensive forward (Guy Carbonneau Trophy). He finished the season with 78 points in 55 games with a plus-minus of plus 20.

International play

Although born in France, Groulx has represented Canada in international competition and has played in the 2016 Winter Youth Olympics where he played 6 games for Canada scoring 4 goals with 2 assists. He also competed in the 2016 World U-17 Hockey Challenge where he played for Canada Red. The team finished first in Group B and Groulx played 5 games for the team, scoring 1 goal and 1 assist. Although not a tournament regulated by the International Ice Hockey Federation but still considered a major event for under-18 players; Groulx next played in the 2017 Ivan Hlinka Memorial Tournament where he played 5 games for Canada scoring 1 goal and 2 assists with 6 penalty minutes, winning gold with the team.

Personal life
Groulx was born in Rouen, France but grew up in Gatineau, Quebec where he attended Polyvalente Nicolas-Gatineau, a public secondary school in Gatineau. He speaks fluent French. Groulx is the son of Benoit Groulx, a former professional ice hockey player and current head coach of the Syracuse Crunch in the American Hockey League.

Career statistics

Regular season and playoffs

International

References

External links 
 

2000 births
Living people
Anaheim Ducks draft picks
Anaheim Ducks players
Canadian ice hockey centres
French ice hockey players
Halifax Mooseheads players
Ice hockey people from Gatineau
Ice hockey players at the 2016 Winter Youth Olympics
San Diego Gulls (AHL) players
Sportspeople from Rouen
Youth Olympic silver medalists for Canada